IgroMir (Gaming World) is the first large-scale annual exhibition of computer and video games in Russia, organized in Moscow by the committee of the Russian Game Developers Conference (KRI) since 2006.

The exhibition quickly grew to a four-day event (Thursday to Sunday), with the first day reserved for industry members, the press, and VIPs. It was held on the first weekend of November at VDNKh Exhibition Center for its first five years, then from 2011 moved to Crocus Expo and was held on the first weekend of October.  Since 2014, Comic-Con Russia has been held as part of IgroMir and attendance has averaged 160,000 people, the capacity of the venue.

History

2006
The exhibition was first held 4–5 November 2006, at the VDNKh Exhibition Center. According to the organizers, attendance exceeded 25,000 people. About 45 domestic and foreign companies were present, showing more than 100 games for different platforms.

2007
In 2007, IgroMir returned to the VDNKh Center for an expanded exhibition 2–4 November (Friday to Sunday). The exhibition was attended by domestic game companies such as Russobit-M, 1C, Akella, and Nival Online, as well as by Western publishers such as Electronic Arts, Microsoft, Sony Computer Entertainment, Nintendo, Sega and others. Some games were shown to the public for the first time. Many were presented by developers, such as Epic Games President Mike Capps, Ubisoft's Jade Raymond and representatives of Bizarre Creations, Creative Assembly and Running with Scissors.

2008
IgroMir continued to grow and switched to a four-day format (Thursday to Sunday) held on 6–9 November in 2008. The first day was called the business day in which games were presented to industry members and the press in arelaxed business setting. The remaining three days were open to the public. The total number of visitors exceeded 65,000 people, with more than 120 exhibitors. Among them were leading western companies: Electronic Arts, Microsoft, Sony Computer Entertainment, Nintendo, Sega, Ubisoft, and Blizzard Entertainment.

2009
The 2009 exhibition again took place at the VDNKh Center, 5–8 November. According to estimates of the organizers and the VDNKh police department, the exhibition was visited by 82,000 people. The exhibition attracted domestic game companies (such as 1C, Akella, Buka, Nival), and Western companies Microsoft, Sony Computer Entertainment, Blizzard Entertainment, Electronic Arts, Activision, Nintendo and Sega. VIP guests to the exhibition included Joe Kucan and Anatoly Wasserman.

2010
In 2010, the fifth IgroMir was held 3–6 November at VDNKh, and was partnered with Gamer.ru social network and Mail.ru. The business day was attended by more than 3,500 professionals and more than 900 members of the press. According to estimates of the organizers and police, over 90,000 people attended.

2011
The sixth edition of the exhibition was held at the Crocus Expo hall in Moscow, held  6–9 October. The total size of the exhibition exceeded . It attracted Microsoft, Sony Computer Entertainment, Nintendo, Electronic Arts, 1C-SoftClub, Akella, Nival, Wargaming.net, Gaijin Entertainment, Blizzard Entertainment and others. In addition to exhibits, a main stage had a special entertainment program which included rapper Noize MC and Underwood. As in the previous three years, the four-day exhibition began with a business day followed by three public admission days.

2012
IgroMir 2012 was held 4–7 October at Crocus Expo. For the first time, family games were exhibited in a separate room. There was also competitive gaming, featuring the final fights of the Panzar: Forged by Chaos game contest with prize money of  million.

2013
IgroMir 2013 was held 3–6 October at Crocus Expo. There was a separate room for competitive gaming, where tournaments were held for the final of League of Legends, StarCraft II, and others.

2014
In 2014, IgroMir was held 2–5 October at Crocus Expo and combined with the Russian Game Developers Conference (KRI). The first Comic-Con Russia was also hosted as part of IgroMir. Attendance over the four days was estimated at 152,000.

2015
In 2015, IgroMir was held 1–4 October at Crocus Expo, and again included Comic-Con Russia. Cosplayers were also recruited for the exhibition. Attendance exceeded 160,000.

2016
In 2016, IgroMir was held 29 September to 2 October at Crocus Expo. There were 250 exhibiting companies attracting 1,900 members of the press and an estimated 163,000 attendees.

2017
In 2017, IgroMir was held 28 September to 11 October at Crocus Expo. The main guests were game developer Richard Garriott, and actors Christopher Lloyd, Rutger Hauer and Stephanie Corneliussen.

2018
In 2018, IgroMir was held 4–7 October at Crocus Expo. Comic-Con Russia continued to be held with it. As in the past years, attendance strained the four-day 160,000-capacity limit of the venue. To date, this was the last IgroMir.

2019
In 2019, the exhibition was scheduled for 3–6 October at Crocus Expo but it was cancelled for unknown reasons.

2020 
In 2020, the exhibition was scheduled for 1–4 October at Crocus Expo but it was cancelled due to COVID-19 pandemic.

2021 
In 2021, the exhibition was scheduled for 7–10 October at Crocus Expo but it was cancelled again due to COVID-19 pandemic.

2022 
There is no official announcement.

Attendance

See also

 Asia Game Show
 Electronic Entertainment Expo
 Game Developers Conference
 Gamescom
 Games Convention
Paris Game Festival
 Russian Game Developers Conference
 Tokyo Game Show

References

External links
 Official website

Events in Moscow
Video game trade shows
Video gaming in Russia
Gaming conventions